The 1991 NBL season was the tenth season of the National Basketball League. Hutt Valley won the championship in 1991 to claim their first league title.

Final standings

Season awards
 NZ Most Valuable Player: Byron Vaetoe (New Plymouth)
 Most Outstanding Guard: Eddie Anderson (Canterbury)
 Most Outstanding NZ Guard: Byron Vaetoe (New Plymouth)
 Most Outstanding Forward: Darryl Johnson (Hutt Valley)
 Most Outstanding NZ Forward/Centre: Peter Pokai (Hutt Valley)
 Scoring Champion: Ronnie Joyner (Waikato)
 Rebounding Champion: Willie Burton (New Plymouth)
 Assist Champion: Kenny McFadden (Wellington)
 Young Player of the Year: Warren Adams (Hutt Valley)
 Coach of the Year: Jeff Green (Hutt Valley)
 All-Star Five:
 Eddie Anderson (Canterbury)
 Kerry Boagni (Wellington)
 Tony Brown (Hutt Valley)
 Willie Burton (New Plymouth)
 Darryl Johnson (Hutt Valley)

References

National Basketball League (New Zealand) seasons
1991 in New Zealand basketball